The Municipality of Trebnje is a municipality in Slovenia in the traditional region of Lower Carniola. The seat of the municipality is the town of Trebnje.

The municipality was established on 3 October 1994. It was increased in size on 6 August 1998, when the settlements of Kostanjevica and Ravne nad Šentrupertom were transferred to the municipality from the neighboring Municipality of Litija. It was then reduced in size on 13 June 2006 with the formation of the new municipalities of Mokronog-Trebelno and Šentrupert from the municipality's territory. On February 26, 2011, Trebnje was again reduced in size when the Municipality of Mirna was reestablished.

Settlements
In addition to the municipal seat of Trebnje, the municipality also includes the following settlements:

 Arčelca
 Artmanja Vas
 Babna Gora
 Belšinja Vas
 Benečija
 Bič
 Blato
 Breza
 Čatež
 Češnjevek
 Cesta
 Dečja Vas
 Dobrava
 Dobravica pri Velikem Gabru
 Dobrnič
 Dol pri Trebnjem
 Dolenja Dobrava
 Dolenja Nemška Vas
 Dolenja Vas pri Čatežu
 Dolenje Kamenje pri Dobrniču
 Dolenje Medvedje Selo
 Dolenje Ponikve
 Dolenje Selce
 Dolenji Podboršt pri Trebnjem
 Dolenji Podšumberk
 Dolenji Vrh
 Dolga Njiva pri Šentlovrencu
 Dolnje Prapreče
 Goljek
 Gombišče
 Gorenja Dobrava
 Gorenja Nemška Vas
 Gorenja Vas
 Gorenja Vas pri Čatežu
 Gorenje Kamenje pri Dobrniču
 Gorenje Medvedje Selo
 Gorenje Ponikve
 Gorenje Selce
 Gorenji Podboršt pri Veliki Loki
 Gorenji Podšumberk
 Gorenji Vrh pri Dobrniču
 Gorica na Medvedjeku
 Gornje Prapreče
 Gradišče pri Trebnjem
 Grič pri Trebnjem
 Grm
 Grmada
 Hudeje
 Iglenik pri Veliki Loki
 Jezero
 Kamni Potok
 Knežja Vas
 Korenitka
 Korita
 Kriška Reber
 Križ
 Krtina
 Krušni Vrh
 Kukenberk
 Lipnik
 Lisec
 Log pri Žužemberku
 Lokve pri Dobrniču
 Lukovek
 Luža
 Mačji Dol
 Mačkovec
 Mala Loka
 Mala Ševnica
 Male Dole pri Stehanji Vasi
 Mali Gaber
 Mali Videm
 Martinja Vas
 Medvedjek
 Meglenik
 Mrzla Luža
 Muhabran
 Občine
 Odrga
 Orlaka
 Pekel
 Pluska
 Podlisec
 Potok
 Preska pri Dobrniču
 Primštal
 Pristavica pri Velikem Gabru
 Račje Selo
 Razbore
 Rdeči Kal
 Repče
 Replje
 Reva
 Rihpovec
 Rodine pri Trebnjem
 Roje pri Čatežu
 Roženpelj
 Rožni Vrh
 Šahovec
 Sejenice
 Sela pri Šumberku
 Šentlovrenc
 Škovec
 Šmaver
 Štefan pri Trebnjem
 Stehanja Vas
 Stranje pri Dobrniču
 Stranje pri Velikem Gabru
 Studenec
 Svetinja
 Trebanjski Vrh
 Trnje
 Vavpča Vas pri Dobrniču
 Vejar
 Velika Loka
 Velika Ševnica
 Velike Dole
 Veliki Gaber
 Veliki Videm
 Volčja Jama
 Vrbovec
 Vrhovo pri Šentlovrencu
 Vrhtrebnje
 Vrtače
 Žabjek
 Zagorica pri Čatežu
 Zagorica pri Dobrniču
 Zagorica pri Velikem Gabru
 Zavrh
 Železno
 Zidani Most
 Žubina

References

External links

Municipality of Trebnje on Geopedia
Trebnje municipal site 

 
1994 establishments in Slovenia
Trebnje